A state park in Brazil is a legally defined type of protected area operated by one of the states.
Their goal is to preserve important or beautiful natural ecosystems.
Public access is allowed subject to regulations defined by the responsible agency.

Definition

State parks fall under the same regulations as national parks, defined by law 9.985 of July 2000.
The park's basic objective is preservation of natural ecosystems of great ecological relevance and scenic beauty.
This enables the conduct of scientific research and the development of educational activities and environmental interpretation, recreation in contact with nature and eco tourism.
The park is publicly owned, and private areas included in its limits will be expropriated when it is established.
Public visitation is subject to the rules and restrictions set out in Unit Management Plan, rules established by the body responsible for its administration, and those provided for by regulation.
Scientific research requires prior authorization from the agency responsible for managing the unit and is subject to conditions and restrictions established by the agency.

State parks are classed as IUCN protected area category II (national park).
They are administered by the government institute of each state responsible for the environment.

Examples

Notes

Sources

 
Lists of protected areas of Brazil
Types of protected area of Brazil